Jed John Steer (born 23 September 1992) is an English professional footballer who plays as a goalkeeper for  club Aston Villa.

Steer joined Villa from his hometown club Norwich City on 1 July 2013, after beginning his playing career with the Canaries. He has also played on loan for Yeovil Town, Cambridge United, Doncaster Rovers and Charlton Athletic, as well as England at under-16, under-17 and under-19 level. He is also eligible to represent Scotland.

Early life
Born in Norwich, Norfolk, Steer joined the Norwich City Academy at the age of 9. He was spotted playing in goal and City invited the youngster for a trial. It was not long before he was offered a youth contract by them.

Club career

Norwich City
Steer signed his first professional contract on his 17th birthday. He was first named as a substitute for the FA Cup Second Round tie against Carlisle United in the 2009–10 season. Steer played a vital role in the 2010–11 FA Youth Cup; in the Third Round, he saved a penalty in the last minute against Charlton Athletic to ensure Norwich won the game 1–0. His coach Ricky Martin said after the game;

"He's probably the best under-18 goalkeeper in the country, If ever you wanted somebody in goal Jed's the one and he stepped up and made a fantastic save." 

He made his first-team debut on 28 January 2012, in a fourth round FA Cup 2–1 victory against West Bromwich Albion.

Yeovil Town (loan)
In July 2011, Yeovil Town confirmed that Steer had joined them on a three-month loan deal. Steer made his first senior appearance and Football League debut in the opening game of the 2011–12 Football League One season in which Yeovil lost 2–0 away to Brentford. He returned to Norwich on 13 October after suffering a thigh injury.

Cambridge United (loan)
Steer joined Cambridge United on a one-month loan deal on 9 November 2012, until 8 December 2012.

Aston Villa
On 26 June 2013, Aston Villa announced that they would sign Steer on 1 July when he became a free agent.

The deal went forward according to plan. Villa gave him the number 13 shirt, replacing Shay Given and therefore securing the No.2 spot. He played in the League Cup 2nd round win against Rotherham United 3 – 0, keeping a clean sheet. He also kept a clean sheet in Villa's 1–0 pre-season victory over MLS side Houston Dynamo on 26 July 2014. On 24 May 2015, Steer made his Premier League debut for Villa in a 0–1 loss against Burnley.

Doncaster Rovers (loan)
After the departure of Ross Turnbull to league counterparts Barnsley, Doncaster Rovers signed Steer on a three-month loan deal on 1 August 2014. On 31 October 2014, Steer's loan ended after 17 appearances in all competitions, recording six clean sheets.

Yeovil Town (loan)
On 31 October 2014, Yeovil Town re-signed Steer on loan from Aston Villa until 31 January 2015.

Huddersfield Town (loan)
On 11 September 2015, Steer joined Championship side Huddersfield Town on a one-month loan. He made his début the next day in Town's 2–0 loss against Cardiff City. He played on loan for 2 months, before returning to Villa, but then he returned for another month from 26 November 2015. After that was completed on 26 December, he returned to Villa, but when the Winter transfer window opened, he returned to Huddersfield for the remainder of the season.

Charlton Athletic (loan)
On 10 August 2018, Steer joined League One side Charlton Athletic on a season-long loan.
Jed Steer was recalled by Aston Villa on Monday 31 December 2018 due to an injury to Orjan Nyland.

Return to Villa 
Jed Steer was recalled to cover for Villa's new signing Lovre Kalinić after Orjan Nyland was injured, but following an injury to Kalinic during a match against West Brom, Steer was subbed on at halftime. He then started the following match against Stoke City, and his impressive performance meant that he continued to play the next match against Derby, despite Kalinic returning from injury, before retaining his place in Villa's following match, the Second City Derby against Birmingham City. Steer's good performances continued, and he quickly became first-choice keeper for Dean Smith, which saw Steer become part of a record-breaking ten-league-game winning streak for Aston Villa. Steer starred in Aston Villa's Championship play-offs semi-final win against West Bromwich Albion, saving two penalties from Mason Holgate and Ahmed Hegazi in a 4–3 shoot-out win to help send Aston Villa to the play-off finals for a second consecutive year.

Luton Town (loan)
On 31 January 2022, Steer again returned to the Championship on loan, joining Luton Town on loan until the end of the 2021–22 season. He made his debut on 5 February, keeping a clean sheet in a 3–0 away victory over Cambridge United in the FA Cup. On 2 March 2022, Steer suffered an achilles tendon injury in a FA Cup game against Chelsea. Steer had previously suffered a partial tear to this achilles in a game for Villa in 2019, but it was not confirmed by Luton manager Nathan Jones if this injury was on the same foot, only that Steer's season was over.

International career
As well as England eligibility through his birth in Norwich, he is able to represent Scotland through his mother's side of the family. He made his youth international début in October 2007 for the England U16s as his side lifted the Sky Sports Victory Shield, and were champions of the Montaigu Tournament in which Steer produced the match-winning penalty save.

In August 2008, he was called up for the England U17, aged 15, for friendly matches against Italy, Portugal and Israel. He made his England U17 debut against Armenia in October 2008. They went on to qualify for the UEFA European Under-17 Football Championship but very much under achieved and failed to qualify for the FIFA U-17 World Cup.

Steer made his England U19 debut against Cyprus in October 2010, keeping a clean sheet and saving a penalty in the process.

Career statistics

Honours
Aston Villa
EFL Championship play-offs: 2019

References

External links

1992 births
Living people
Footballers from Norwich
English footballers
England youth international footballers
Association football goalkeepers
Norwich City F.C. players
Yeovil Town F.C. players
Cambridge United F.C. players
Aston Villa F.C. players
Doncaster Rovers F.C. players
Huddersfield Town A.F.C. players
Charlton Athletic F.C. players
Luton Town F.C. players
English Football League players
Premier League players